James Masters may refer to:

James Masters (Gaelic footballer) (born 1982), Irish footballer for the Nemo Rangers
Judy Masters (James William Masters, 1892–1955), Australian footballer
James M. Masters Sr. (1911–1988), United States Marine Corps general

See also
James Marsters (born 1962), American actor and musician
James C. Marsters (1924–2009), inventor